Thomas Nivison Haining CMG (15 March 1927 – 17 July 2005), was a British diplomat. He was ambassador to Mongolia from 1979 to 1982.

Career

In 1952, Haining entered the British government's Foreign Service, later transferring to the Diplomatic Service, and saw service in Vienna, Moscow, Rome and New York. From 1979 to 1982 he was British ambassador to the Mongolian People's Republic.

Following his retirement, Haining settled in Brechin in Angus, Scotland. He became an honorary research associate in history at the University of Aberdeen and honorary president of the Chinese Studies Group. He became a frequent contributor about Mongolia and the history of the Mongols to academic journals. He also edited, translated from the German and contributed to Genghis Khan: His Life and Legacy by Paul Ratchnevsky. The Royal Asiatic Society reviewer commented: "The translation is excellent. Mr Haining is to be congratulated on his contribution to what is in many respects an improvement even on Ratchnevsky's splendid work."

Honours
Most Distinguished Order of Saint Michael and Saint George

References

1927 births
2005 deaths
Ambassadors of the United Kingdom to Mongolia
20th-century British diplomats
Members of HM Diplomatic Service
Order of St Michael and St George
Alumni of the University of Edinburgh